Iftah Ya Simsim (meaning "Open Sesame") is the first international co-production of the American children's television series Sesame Street created in the Arabian world.  It premiered in Kuwait on September 14, 1979, and was broadcast in 22 Arabic-speaking countries, running until June 23, 1989. The program continued to be well-known decades after it went off the air.

A few months after its premiere, Iftah Ya Simsim became one of the most popular and successful programs for children in many Arab states.  Critics called it "one of the most successful pan-Arab collaborations of educators, creators, writers and artists from the Middle East". The show inspired many studies, which demonstrated that children benefited from watching it. 
In 2010, efforts began to revive the show for a new generation of young viewers in the Arab world.  In late 2013, fifteen writers and producers from Bidaya Media attended training about its educational methodology and production techniques from the staff of the American show in New York.  Iftah Ya Simsim was in pre-production in March 2014, and the first phase of auditions took place in April 2014. The new series debuted on September 1, 2015.

The present show is a collaboration between the Abu Dhabi Education Council, Twofour54, Arab Bureau of Education for the Gulf States and Bidaya Media.

History 
A few months after the 1969 debut of Sesame Street on PBS in the US, producers from several countries all around the world approached the Children's Television Workshop (CTW, later the Sesame Workshop, or "the Workshop"), the organization responsible for the show's production, to create and produce versions of Sesame Street in their countries. Co-creator Joan Ganz Cooney was approached by German public television officials about a year after the US version debuted. Many years later, Cooney recalled, "To be frank, I was really surprised, because we thought we were creating the quintessential American show. We thought the Muppets were quintessentially American, and it turns out they're the most international characters ever created". She hired former CBS executive Mike Dann, who left commercial television to become her assistant, as a CTW vice-president. One of Dann's tasks was to field offers to produce versions of Sesame Street in other countries.  By summer 1970, he had made the first international agreements for what the CTW came to call "co-productions".

Kuwaiti educators had reason to be interested in an Arabic co-production. Kuwait's 1980 census, conducted shortly after the original show's premiere, showed that 48% of its citizens were "either totally illiterate or ... barely [able to] read or write". Several studies in Kuwait showed that parents' illiteracy adversely affected their children's educational and social development.  Half of Kuwaitis who lived in the rural areas of the country were illiterate. Literacy rates for women and girls were worse: UNESCO reported in 2005 that they "account for two thirds of the region's illiterates".  In 2000, before the revived show aired, the Arab region had some of the world's lowest adult literacy rates, at a little over 62%, which was well below the world average of 84% and in developing countries (almost 76.5%).  The Kuwaiti 1980 census also showed that even though Kindergarten was free for its citizens, 30% of children aged 3 to 5 attended; the number was much lower for the 12 million preschoolers in the Arab world, at about 2%.  Girls attended school less commonly than boys in Arab countries.

In 1976, the Arab fund for Social and Economic Development held a series of workshops and seminars, attended by educators, mass media officers, and social planners, about preschool education in the region.   In 1978, educators, mass media officers, and social planners agreed to adopt Sesame Street as a feasible and economical solution for the low attendance in preschools. They approached the Children's Television Workshop (CTW), the producers of the American show, and purchased the rights to create an Arab version for US$2.5 million. With funding from the Arab Gulf States Joint Program Production Institution, movement was made to create a co-production for the children of Kuwait and for the Arab world. This program, called Iftah Ya Simsim, premiered in Kuwait in 1979 and ran until 1989, when the Gulf War stopped production. It was broadcast in 22 Arab countries, and continued to be well-known decades after it went off the air. In June 2010, the Sesame Workshop and the Arab Bureau of Education for the Gulf States (ABEGS), a regional Gulf Cooperation Council (GCC) organization dedicated to education, research, and development, agreed to bring back the show.

Original series
Iftah Ya Simsim was the first children's educational TV program of its kind in the Arab world and the first Sesame Street co-production in the region. It was the first co-production to use Modern Standard Arabic (MSA).

Production 
Its development was similar to that of the American version of Sesame Street in the late 1960s. The GCC considered creating a co-production for many years, so consultations were held among its member countries regarding how to do so. Many of the early co-productions were simple, dubbed versions with local language voice-overs and instructional cutaways, but the GCC wanted to create their own original version.

They established the Joint Program Production Institute (JPPI) to work with the CTW to create a Sesame Street co-production in addition to creating several children's TV shows. The JPPI formed a team, which visited the CTW in New York to negotiate the production of 130 30-minute programs, purchasing the rights to create an Arab version for US$2.5 million, and bringing in experts from throughout the Arab world "to introduce an all encompassing Arabic curriculum that would teach and cultivate Arab values and culture".

There were three stages in the production of the show. The first stage was pre-production research, which identified basic education needs for children under the age of six. The second stage involved the creation of a pilot reel to test children on the show's effects and for review by educators, sociologists, psychologists, and other experts, who were invited to a seminar. Finally, the series was filmed and aired. Research began in August 1977; the team was led by an educator and included a linguist and a psychologist, all of whom were on the faculty of Kuwait University. The show was tested on different socioeconomic groups of children, between the ages of three and six, in kindergartens and preschools in four representative cities from Arab countries. The team proposed curriculum goals based upon the research and, during a seminar, Arab and CTW educators agreed on ten final goals.

Iftah Ya Simsim premiered in Kuwait in September 1979, and was broadcast in all Arabic-speaking countries excluding Egypt.

Content 
The show focused on Arab heritage, like the wedding rituals of countries in the region, and included Arabic poems and songs. 

Iftah Ya Simsim emphasized scientific thinking and the effects of technology on society. It sought to provide children with experiences that enriched their knowledge about their environment and improved their reasoning, through teaching them mathematical and geometric concepts. The show introduced its viewers to Arab history through segments which, for example, showed castles that were the center of historic battles. Geography was highlighted, especially the location of countries and their cities and capitals, which had the secondary effect of helping children increase their feelings of belonging and feeling proud of their Arab heritage. Children's social awareness, especially their comprehension of social roles and their functions, was also emphasized.

Unlike the American show, Iftah Ya Simsim covered the topic of spirituality because of the importance of religion in Arab culture, so the producers' goals included teaching children about Islamic principles, positive social behavior, personal manners, and the importance of traits like honesty, respect for parents, loyalty, and social interaction. According to researchers Misbah Al-Khayr and Hashim Al-Samira'i, the program reinforced "the values and ethics that are derived from the teaching of orthodox Islam ... to help children develop a sound moral vision on the basis of which they will build their family relationships, and which will reinforce the values of cooperation, love, and justice".

The producers wanted to present the characteristics of the Arabic language and its alphabet. Because pre-production research showed that, although many dialects are spoken in the region, 90% of Arab children were able to understand Modern Standard Arabic (MSA), it was chosen as the show's language. Linguist Kees Versteegh stated that the language used in Iftah Ya Simsim was "based on an explicit didactic and linguistic concept". The show's developers decided to use specific aspects of the language. Despite the absence of case endings in the dialects spoken by many of its users, the producers used them and other features of MSA. They also spelled out what features should be used sparingly, like passive verb forms, and what features they wanted to completely avoid, such as some prepositions. According to Versteegh, "These principles have been followed rather closely". Children who appeared on the show made few grammatical errors in MSA, and although colloquialisms were used rarely, there was an informal quality in their conversations and speech patterns. Versteegh postulated that it was due to the use of intonation patterns and interjections, instead of the use of grammatical and lexical items from the vernacular use of the language. He also said that Iftah Ya Simsim proved that it was "possible to use an informal register of Modern Standard Arabic". Versteegh reported that although the show was criticized in some Arab countries, Egypt in particular, for containing too many colloquialisms, he thought the criticism was biased and that "the selection of lexical items in any pan-Arabic programme will probably never satisfy everybody".

Characters 
New Muppets were created, inspired by cultural traditions in the Arab world, from the shadow puppets of Syria to the puppets of Egypt, some of the oldest puppets in the world. These characters included a camel named Nu'man (نُعمان), a green and yellow parrot named Malsoon (َْمَلْسون), a lavender-colored monster with a long nose named Yagut, and a large purple ribbon-wearing cat called Abla.

Characters from the American show, like the Cookie Monster, Bert and Ernie, Grover, and Kermit, were transposed into Arabic versions: Kaaki, Bader and Anees, Gharghour, and Kamil. The show's version of the Count kept his distinctive laugh and accent when speaking MSA.

The show's opening included a song alongside footage of children across the Arab world running past familiar landmarks like the Pyramids and playing in playgrounds and ancient alleyways before running into a white fort that had its gates open wide. The show's set consisted of an intricately traditional Arab neighborhood called Sharee Eshreen (20th Street).

Legacy and influence 
According to researcher Ibrahim Al-Khulaifi, "In a few months, Iftah Ya Simsim became one of the most popular and successful programs for children in many Arab states". Critics called it "one of the most successful pan-Arab collaborations of educators, creators, writers and artists from the Middle East". The show continued to trigger nostalgia in its fans, some of whom watched its reruns well into the 1990s. Rym Ghazal of The National claimed "No Arabic children's television show was as popular and influential in the Middle East in the 1980s as Iftah Ya Sim Sim...because it offered an alternative way of learning that hardly existed in the Arab world at the time, just as Sesame Street had previously done in the West".

Iftah Ya Simsim inspired "a flood of studies", from scientific research to doctoral or masters theses submitted to Arab, European, and American universities. No studies were conducted during the show's first five years, largely due to lack of government cooperation and unsuccessful attempts marred by subjects dropping out of the studies. In 1981, however, the JPPI invited children from Arab countries to Kuwait to access how they assimilated the program. Their attitudes about the show were assessed by education, social, and media specialists, who found that most viewers had benefited from watching it. Parents reported that their children's language use and ability improved, and the JPPI received many letters of appreciation and was commended for their efforts in producing the show. In 1984, in one of the first studies conducted researching the show's effects on its young viewers, Ibrahim Al-Khulaifi compared the relationship between the viewing behavior by the Kuwaiti preschooler of Iftah Ya Simsim and certain developmental and environmental variables. He found that variables such as socioeconomic status, parental education (especially that of the mother), sex, age, year in school, birth order, and family attitudes about the show influenced the frequency of viewing.

Misbah Al-Khayr and Hashim Al-Samira'i, in an article from the 1995 book Children in the Muslim Middle East, reported on a study that sought to evaluate the influence of Iftah Ya Simsim on its Baghdadi viewers' knowledge about language, general information, mathematics, science, and moral principles. The study found that 85% of all children residing in Baghdad had watched it and that they interacted with and were attached to many of its characters, who exposed viewers to the accents of the region. The most popular segments were those that contained cartoons, songs, and puppets. The show's viewers demonstrated an increase in their understanding and knowledge in all areas, especially information about their social and natural environment.

Revival 
In 2010, the Sesame Workshop and the Arab Bureau of Education for the Gulf States (ABEGS), which recognized "the deep love for the program" felt throughout the Arab world, started talks about relaunching Iftah Ya Simsim. Pre-production research and preparation took two years. The ABEGS and the Sesame Workshop signed an agreement to revive the series for Arab television, with content suitable for a new generation of children. The show was the first educational initiative sponsored by the Mubadala Development Company, the investment vehicle of the Abu Dhabi government. The production company Bidaya Media was chosen to produce the show; in 2013, the company was housed at Twofour54, the United Arab Emirates version of public television. The show was supported by organizations all over the world; Feras Al-Maddah, Iftah Ya Simsim's representative at the GCC, stated, "It is a public/private sector partnership and we will need the support of all to extend the communication channels and continue producing more educational products".

A seminar was held in 2011 to design the show's curriculum and educational framework. The seminar, also attended by ABEGS representatives, was sponsored by the GCC Joint Program Production Institution (GCC-JPPI) and Saudi Basic Industries Corporation (SABIC), a manufacturing company based in Riyadh and one of the private corporations that sponsored the new show. The participants took into consideration the educational changes that had occurred in the region in the previous 20 years, including a more diverse and complicated world and a need for more creativity to educate young children. The seminar focused on the education needs of children throughout the Arab world, the possible effects of the show's return, and how to provide educational resources and technology to children in the 21st century. The seminar participants recommended the creation of an advisory council, consisting of education experts and media professionals, as well as expanding to new media forms other than TV, and including important Arab celebrities as guests on the show, all components that the American show used.

Other curriculum topics chosen during the seminar included Arabic culture and heritage, school readiness, health and wellness, and female education. The seminar participants decided to use MSA, like the producers had done for the original show, citing an even greater need to expose children to the Arabic language. As with the original, outreach was an important part of the new show. Even before the show aired, four characters from the original toured the region, educating young children and their families about road and car safety. The cast and crew took a break from filming for a few months for "constant live events" to interact with their young viewers. Books, DVDs, CDs, online material and outreach programs for children, parents, and teachers were produced.

In late 2013, fifteen writers and producers from Bidaya Media attended training about its education methodology and production techniques from the staff of the American show in New York. The Saudi Gazette reported that Iftah Ya Simsim was in pre-production in March 2014, and that the first phase of auditions took place in April 2014, after, according to Al-Sharhan, a year of designing the show, "with input from child development experts, educators and cultural consultants". A casting call for a competitive search of performers specializing in puppeteering, voice, singing, and movement was sent to universities, theaters, and cultural centers in Abu Dhabi, where it was filmed, and through social media. They cast Arabic-speaking performers, although no prior acting experience was required. Dina al Saleh, a puppeteer from Alam Simsim, the Egyptian co-production, screened the first group of candidates, and then the final cast of seven puppeteers were chosen after ten days of workshops with Marty Robinson and other Sesame Workshop puppeteers from New York. According to an editorial in The National, the new version of the show was significant because it encouraged Emiratis and other Arabs to become more involved in filmmaking and, more importantly, it focused on "locally relevant Arabic-language content that will seek to educate present and future generations".

Relaunch
After a 25-year hiatus, the show was relaunched in September 2015, appearing on nine regional stations with Abu Dhabi Al Emarat TV and Sharjah TV among them but they only use Numberkids 1, 2, 3, 4 and 5.  At the time of the re-launch the show was expected to reach 45 million viewers. The production was a collaboration between the Abu Dhabi Education Council, twofour54, the Arab Bureau of Education for the Gulf States and Bedia Media. Along with live shows at schools, the show interacted with fans by means of Facebook, a YouTube channel, and Instagram accounts. The show announced its focus on regional traditions, culture, values, customs, and manners with the characters speaking in classical Arabic.

The much loved character No'man the camel and the bird muppet Melsoon returned for the new run. They were joined by new muppets: "Shams, a quick witted 6-year-old girl who is full of energy and loves to express herself" and "cute Gargour (Grover), a special resident on Iftah Ya Simsim who provides his trademark zaniness, comic chaos and a unique perspective on the world." Six puppeteers were involved with season one: Abdullah Kassem, Asma Alshamsi, Natheer Khawaldeh, Maher Mozawak, Noura Sadaka, and Michel Jabali. Actors appearing on the show with the muppets included Abdulla Rafa (in the role of Rashid) and Fatma Al Taei (as Amal). The educational content of the show is directed by the Educational Advisory Committee and the representatives of the Arab Bureau of Education for the Gulf States (ABEGS).

In 2017, the show launched a special, 12-minute version of the show for the month of Ramadan. Thirty episodes were produced and regularly feature Super Grover 2.0, Elmo's Game Show, Cookie's Crumby Pictures, and segments from the Dream, Save, Do campaign, as well as interviews with children.

In February 2017 Bidaya Media started production on season two of the relaunch of Iftah Ya Simsim, Noura Sadaka and Natheer Khawaldeh didn't come back for the new season. In addition, two new Muppets were introduced to the cast, Ka'aki (Cookie Monster) and Elmo. Puppeteer and Voice actor Ammar Sabban was hired to replace Natheer Khawaldeh as Gargour and was also chosen to play Ka'aki, and Abdullah Rafa also joined the puppeteer team to play Elmo. 

The third and final season premiered in May 2019 with 52 episodes. The show was succeeded by Ahlan Simsim in 2020.

Ahlan Simsim 

Ahlan Simsim (translating to "Welcome Sesame") is an Arabic co-production of Sesame Street that premiered on February 2, 2020, on MBC 3.

The series features three original Muppet characters to the series: Basma, Jad, and Ma'zooza. In addition to human cast members, the series also includes localized versions of Gargur (Grover), Kaaki (Cookie Monster), and Elmo from Iftah Ya Simsim. 

The series is funded by a grant from the MacArthur Foundation and is produced in collaboration with the International Rescue Committee. The first season is designed to teach how to identify and manage emotions. Syrians, Lebanese, Jordanians, and Iraqis are in the target audience.

Episodes

Series overview

Notes

Works cited
 Al-Khayr, Misbah; Hashim Al-Samira'i (1995).  "Iftah Ya Simsim (Open Sesame) and Children in Baghdad". Translated by Ahmed Sweity. In Elizabeth Warnock Fernea (ed.).  Children in the Muslim Middle East. Austin, Texas: University of Texas Press, pp. 464–468. 
 Al-Khulaifi, Ibrahim Mohammed (1984). An Investigation of the Viewing Behavior toward Iftah Ya Simsim by Kuwaiti Kindergartners (PhD). Ohio State University. Retrieved July 2, 2014.
 Cole, Charlotte F.; Beth A. Richman and Susan A. McCann Brown (2001). "The World of Sesame Street Research". In Shalom M. Fisch and Rosemarie T. Truglio (eds.). "G" is for Growing: Thirty Years of Research on Children and Sesame Street. Mahweh, New Jersey: Lawrence Erlbaum Publishers. .
 Davis, Michael (2008). Street Gang: The Complete History of Sesame Street. New York: Viking Press. .
 Gikow, Louise A. (2009). Sesame Street: A Celebration—Forty Years of Life on the Street. New York: Black Dog & Leventhal. .
 Hammoud, Hassan R. (2005). "Illiteracy in the Arab world". Literacy for Life. Education for All Global Monitoring Report 2006 (UNESCO). Retrieved July 2, 2014.

External links

Non-American television series based on American television series
Sesame Street international co-productions
Television series with live action and animation
Television shows featuring puppetry
Mass media in Kuwait
Mass media in the United Arab Emirates